Ang Supremo is a 1988 Filipino action film directed by Joey del Rosario and starring Ramon Revilla as the titular supremo. It also stars Chat Silayan, Eddie Garcia, Jean Saburit, Rommel Valdez, and Miguel Rodriguez.

Produced by GP Films, the film was released on July 21, 1988. Critic Lav Diaz gave Ang Supremo a mixed review, criticizing the film's confusing setting as to whether or not it is about the historical Hukbalahap guerrilla group or the contemporary New People's Army, though he still considered it an adequate action film. Eddie Infante won the Film Academy of the Philippines Award for Best Supporting Actor.

Cast

Ramon Revilla as Luis Talusan
Chat Silayan
Eddie Garcia
Jean Saburit
Rommel Valdez
Miguel Rodriguez
Ulysses Santiago
Greg Moreno
Dennis Isla
Rocco Montalban
Rodolfo Boy Garcia
Gary Gallardo
Jose Romulo
Arsenio Boots Bautista
Karim Kiram
Ernie Ortega
Omar Camar
Lucita Soriano
Johnny Wilson
Ramon d'Salva
Eddie Arenas
Romeo Rivera
Ruben Rustia
Eddie Infante
Johnny Vicar
Renato Robles
Vic Varrion
Robert Talby
Naty Santiago
Ester Chavez
Estrella Kuenzler
Linda Castro
Alex Suñga
Francisco Cruz
E.R. Ejercito
Delia Razon

The poster for Ang Supremo notes that the film has "a cast of [t]housands".

Release
Ang Supremo was released on July 21, 1988, with free diver's watches and T-shirts handed out to early moviegoers in Metro Manila.

Critical response
Lav Diaz, writing for the Manila Standard, criticized the unclear setting of Ang Supremos story as to whether or not it is about the defunct Hukbalahap, a socialist guerilla group formed during World War II, or the contemporary New People's Army, the armed wing of the Communist Party of the Philippines. Diaz also pointed out that the film never used the word "Huk" or any other term referring to the Hukbalahap, adding to the confusion. However, he stated that Ang Supremo is still a fine action film, commending its contextualization of rebellions as chiefly caused by people's suffering in rural areas.

Accolades

References

External links

1988 films
1988 action films
Filipino-language films
Films about rebels
Philippine action films
Films directed by Joey del Rosario